Muhammed Rahman is an electrical engineer at the University of New South Wales, Australia. He was named a Fellow of the Institute of Electrical and Electronics Engineers (IEEE) in 2014 for his contributions to direct torque control of integrated permanent magnet machines.

References 

Fellow Members of the IEEE
Living people
Australian electrical engineers
Year of birth missing (living people)